Galliano were a London-based acid jazz group that was active between 1988 and 1997. The group was the first signing to Eddie Piller and Gilles Peterson's Acid Jazz record label. The original members were Rob Gallagher (vocals - credited as Roberto Galliano), Constantine Weir (vocals), Michael Snaith (The Vibe Controller) and Crispin Robinson (percussion). Other important members included Valerie Etienne, who participated in the recording of all their albums, along with other musicians such as Mick Talbot on keyboards, Crispin Taylor on drums, Ernie McKone on bass guitar, Mark Vandergucht guitar, and Steve Ameedee, otherwise known as Uncle Big Man (dancer). Ski Oakenfull replaced Mick Talbot on keyboards in 1994.

Career 
The group's first single, a reworking of Curtis Mayfield's Freddie's Dead called Frederick Lies Still, was released in June 1988. It was also the first release on the Acid Jazz label. Their second release was on Let the Good Times Roll by The Quiet Boys in 1989. The Quiet Boys was an alias used by acid jazz pioneer Chris Bangs who then went on to produce Galliano.

Galliano's first album release was In Pursuit of the 13th Note in 1991, which was produced by Bangs. Their second album A Joyful Noise Unto the Creator was released in 1992.

Galliano achieved the peak of its success in 1994 with The Plot Thickens which peaked at number eight in the UK Albums Chart. Two UK top 40 singles were released from the album Long Time Gone (a cover of a David Crosby song from the self titled first album by Crosby, Stills & Nash) and Twyford Down. The latter was a comment on the road building protests taking place at the time and the protest at Twyford Down in particular, and they were joined onstage by anti-roads protestors to make appeals to the audience. The album was well received making the NME's list of top 50 albums of the year. Following its release Galliano performed on the Pyramid Stage at the Glastonbury Festival in 1994 and returned to play the NME Stage in 1995.

Galliano's fourth and final studio album :4 was released in 1996.  This included track, Slack Hands, which was used in the title sequence of Kevin Reynolds' 1997 film, One Eight Seven, starring Samuel L. Jackson.

Galliano broke up in 1997. Gallagher together with Etienne formed Two Banks of Four, Gallagher also performs solo using the name Earl Zinger.

Discography

Studio albums
In Pursuit of the 13th Note - 1991 - Talkin' Loud
A Joyful Noise Unto the Creator - 1992 - Talkin' Loud (UK No. 28)
The Plot Thickens - 1994 - Talkin' Loud (UK No. 8)
:4 - 1996 - Talkin' Loud

Live albums 

 Until Such Time (Recorded Live In Europe '92) - 1993 - Talkin' Loud
 Live at Liquid Room (Tokyo) - 1997 - Talkin' Loud

Compilation albums
What Colour Our Flag - 1994 - Talkin' Loud
Thicker Plot (remixes 93-94) - 1994 - Talkin' Loud

Singles

References

External links

Galliano at MusicBrainz

English hip hop groups
Acid jazz ensembles
Talkin' Loud artists
Acid Jazz Records artists